Philip Grausman (born July 16, 1935) is an American sculptor who continues to push the limits of the time-honored portrait in art. Philip Grausman's website

Life and career
Grausman's early work focused on natural forms representing buds and seeds, and this exploration led him to the underlying structure and form of the human head. His monumental heads of fiberglass display a subtle hand, and the lack of detail makes a stunning presentation. He also continues to create reductivist portraits at normal scale, experimenting with various metals with matte finishes to accomplish his vision.

Grausman has received numerous awards, including the Rome Prize in Sculpture, a Ford Foundation Purchase Award, and grants from the National Institute of Arts and Letters and The Louis Comfort Tiffany Foundation among others. His many solo and group exhibitions of sculpture and drawings have been displayed throughout the U.S.

In 1959, Grausman studied with Jose de Creeft at the Art Students League in New York City and earned a MFA from the Cranbrook Academy of Art in Michigan. His work is included in the collections of the Metropolitan Museum of Art, New York City; the Brooklyn Museum, Brooklyn, New York; and the Wadsworth Atheneum, Hartford, Connecticut. Grausman has participated in over eighty solo and group exhibitions at prestigious venues throughout the world, a selection of which includes the National Academy of Design, New York City; Whitney Museum of American Art, New York City; New Arts Gallery, Litchfield, Connecticut; Hollycroft Foundation, The Sculpture Mile, Madison, Connecticut; Pier Walk 2000, Navy Pier, Chicago; DeCordova Museum and Sculpture Park, Lincoln, Massachusetts; Wadsworth Atheneum, Hartford, Connecticut; and the American Academy in Rome, Italy. He has also contributed to the Art in Embassies Program through the U.S. State Department in Washington, D.C. His work is included in various private, museum, and university collections, such as the Baltimore Museum of Art, Maryland; Louis B. Mayer Foundation, Los Angeles; Columbus Museum of Art, Ohio; and the Museum of Contemporary Art, Udine, Italy. Grausman is also known for his studies of birds.

Mario Naves wrote in The New York Observer (August 26, 2008):
"I couldn’t help but wonder what Mr. Grausman’s portrait-heads would look like at, say, MoMA. Both measure roughly 10 feet high and require a significant amount of viewing distance—they could, I think, command MoMA’s enormous contemporary galleries without strain, and maybe with finesse. The proportions of each are as deliberate, if not as overweening, as the museum’s spaces. The coloration of Susanna and Eileen—an emphatic and velvety white—might transform MoMA’s refrigeratorlike ambience into something like the Parthenon.

That’s a stretch, but Mr. Grausman’s profound debt to the art of antiquity renders it not altogether inappropriate. Susanna and Eileen have been shaped with a silky emphasis on idealization—contours slope elegantly, symmetry quietly emphasized, with facial features stoic and streamlined. Though Mr. Grausman’s industrial material retains a certain artificial patina, it ultimately recalls the quarry rather than the factory. A tendency toward abstraction—universality, really—underlines the artist’s belief that art can traverse and find meaning within cultures the world over.

Mr. Grausman’s work is remarkably amenable to public spaces—his sculptures are a highlight of the Pratt Institute’s on-campus sculpture park. But just because the sculptures look great surrounded by trees and under the clouds doesn’t mean they wouldn’t look great indoors. MoMA could do worse—and, in fact, has—than feature Susanna in its atrium gallery. The piece’s free-standing integrity pretty much guarantees that it could withstand practically any surrounding—animate it, too. After all, the best works of art become contexts."

Grace Glueck wrote in The New York Times (June 19, 1998),
“Sculpture portraits stripped to essence are Mr. Grausman’s forte.  Concentrating on volume and form, eliminating inconsequential details, he models faces of expressive vitality by emphasizing their structure and contours. His surfaces are integral to the work: metal, pewter, aluminum and stainless steel in gray tones that add to the distinction of these streamlined but powerful presences.  Mr Grausman’s drawings of nudes, eloquent essays in pure line, are, like his sculptures, distinctive for what they leave out.”

Michael Brenson wrote in The New York Times (November 20, 1987), "Mr. Grausman has described his heads as landscapes, and indeed his aluminum seems to sprout and swell like trees and fruit. In looking for a way of extending the tradition of sculpture from nature, he has found a surprising path."

Hilton Kramer wrote in The New York Times (October 5, 1979), "The portrait sculpture of Philip Grausman is quite unlike anything else on the contemporary art scene today.  For one thing, his portraits are real portraits.  They address themselves to character and personality, and attempt an account of them.  They are not simply a value accumulation of three-dimensional gestures in search of some associations with a recognizable subject.  For another, they are real sculpture.  Their form is compelling, their surfaces have an astonishing clarity and finish, and they have a haunting physical presence.  In a period when portrait sculpture of significant quality is a rarity, Mr. Grausman works as if it were a flourishing genre – and in his portraits, it is.  Mr. Grausman is a phenomenon."

Education
Cranbrook Academy of Art, M.F.A., 1959
Art Students League of New York (studied with Jose de Creeft), 1959
Syracuse University, B.A. cum laude, 1957
Skowhegan School of Painting and Sculpture, Summers 1956 and 1957
Critic of Architectural Drawing, Graduate School of Architecture, Yale University, 1972-2008.

Solo exhibitions
2008 - Katonah Museum of Art, Katonah, New York
2006 - Lohin Geduld Gallery, New York
2005 - Yellow Bird Gallery, Newburgh, New York
2001 - Frederik Meijer Gardens and Sculpture Park, Grand Rapids, Michigan
2001 - Aquinas College; Drawing exhibition, Grand Rapids, Michigan
1998 - Ice Gallery, New York
1997 - Tremaine Gallery, Hotchkiss School, Lakeville, Connecticut
1993 - Babcock Galleries, New York
1988 - Mattatuck Museum, Waterbury, Connecticut
1988 - Wichita Museum of Art, Wichita, Kansas
1987 - Robert Schoelkopf Gallery, New York
1983 - Robert Schoelkopf Gallery, New York
1981 - Washington Art Association, Washington Depot, Connecticut
1979 - Borgenicht Gallery, New York
1978 - Image Gallery, Stockbridge, Massachusetts
1978 - Washington Art Association, Washington Depot, Connecticut
1977 - Pennsylvania State University, University Park, Pennsylvania
1977 - University of New Hampshire, Durham, New Hampshire
1976 - University of Connecticut, Storrs, Connecticut
1975 - Alpha Gallery, Boston, Massachusetts
1974 - Borgenicht Gallery, New York
1972 - Dartmouth College, Hanover, New Hampshire
1968 - Alpha Gallery, Boston, Massachusetts
1966 - Borgenicht Gallery, New York

Awards
2006 - Smithsonian National Portrait Gallery, semifinalist in the Outwin Boocheve Portrait Competition
2003 - Thomas R. Proctor Prize for Sculpture, National Academy of Design, New York, 178th Annual Exhibition
1998 - Alex Ettl Award, National Academy of Design, New York, 173rd Annual Exhibition
1995  - Purchase Award, Connecticut Commission on the Arts, Hartford, Connecticut
1993 - Certificate of Merit in Sculpture, National Academy of Design, New York, 168th Annual Exhibition
1988 - Gold Medal in Sculpture, National Academy of Design, New York, 163rd Annual Exhibition
1984 - Albert Jacobson Memorial Award First Prize for Figurative Sculpture, Silvermine Guild, Connecticut, 34th Annual Art of Northeast U.S.A.
1981 - The Dessie Greer Prize, National Academy of Design, 156th Annual Exhibition, New York
1980 Elected into the National Academy of Design
1980 - The Solon H. Borglum Award for Figurative Sculpture, Silvermine Guild, New Canaan, Connecticut, 30th Annual Art of Northeast U.S.A.
1962-65 - Rome Prize Fellowship in Sculpture, American Academy in Rome
1962 - Ford Foundation Purchase Award
1962 - Alfred G. B. Steel Memorial Prize, Pennsylvania Academy of the Fine Arts: 157th Annual Exhibition
1961 - National Institute of Arts & Letters Grant
1959 - Louis Comfort Tiffany Foundation Grant
1958 - Huntington Hartford Fellowship
1958 - Gold Medal of Honor in Sculpture, Audubon Artists, 17th Annual Exhibition
1957 - Special Honorable Mention, Avery Award, Architectural League of New York, Ida Abrahms Lewis Award, Rochester Museum of Art, Finger Lakes Exhibition

Sculptures in collections (Partial list)

United States

Connecticut
 Martha Grausman, 1975, Wadsworth Atheneum, Hartford

District of Columbia
 José Limón, 1969, National Portrait Gallery, Washington

Massachusetts
 Philip Roth, 1975, Rose Art Museum, Brandeis University, Waltham
 Fruit, 1971, DeCordova Museum and Sculpture Park, Lincoln

Michigan
 Fred and Lena Meijer, 2000, Frederik Meijer Gardens and Sculpture Park, Grand Rapids
 Kathy, 1973, University of Michigan, Ann Arbor
 Arthur Miller, 1980, University of Michigan, Ann Arbor

New Hampshire
 Grasshopper, 1971, Hood Museum of Art, Dartmouth College, Hanover

New Jersey
 Leucantha, 1993, Grounds for Sculpture, Hamilton

New York
 Germinating Form, 197?, Herbert F. Johnson Museum of Art, Cornell University, Ithaca
 Figure, 1962, Herbert F. Johnson Museum of Art, Cornell University, Ithaca
 Isabel Bishop, 1983, Metropolitan Museum of Art, New York City
 Boy and Bird, 1959, Munson Williams Proctor Institute, Utica
 Pea, 1965, Grace Borgenicht Gallery, New York City

Ohio
 Edward Gorey, 1977, Columbus Museum of Art, Columbus

Virginia
 Pat, 1974, Bayly Art Museum, University of Virginia, Charlottesville

Teaching
1972-2008 - Critic of Architectural Drawing, Graduate School of Architecture, Yale University
1992 - Sculptor-in-Residence, Vermont Studio Center
1974-76 - Visiting Assistant Professor of Art, Yale University
1973 - Instructor in Sculpture and Drawing, Skowhegan School of Painting and Sculpture
1972 - Artist-in-Residence, Dartmouth College
1965-69 - Instructor in Design and Drawing, Pratt Institute
1965-67 - Instructor in Design, Cooper Union

References

External links
 Philip Grausman website
 Grounds for Sculpture
 Review 8/26/08 - The New York Observer
 
 McNay Museum of Art

American sculptors
Cranbrook Academy of Art alumni
1935 births
Living people
Skowhegan School of Painting and Sculpture alumni